The 1994 SWAC men's basketball tournament was held March 11–13, 1994, at the Riverside Centroplex in Baton Rouge, Louisiana.  defeated , 70–67 in the championship game. The Tigers received the conference's automatic bid to the 1994 NCAA tournament as No. 15 seed in the Southeast Region.

Bracket and results

References

1993–94 Southwestern Athletic Conference men's basketball season
SWAC men's basketball tournament